James Brodie was a territorial level politician from Northwest Territories, Canada.

Brodie was first elected to the Northwest Territories Legislative Council in the 1951 Northwest Territories general election. He won the new electoral district of Mackenzie South defeating candidate Robert Poritt. He ran for re-election in the 1954 Northwest Territories general election against Poritt and was defeated.

External links
1951 election, Northwest Territories Hansard September 17, 1998

Members of the Legislative Assembly of the Northwest Territories
Year of birth missing
Possibly living people